Tourism is a live album by the English electronic music group Leftfield released in March 2012 with an accompanying DVD with visuals from their latest tour, made by the visual artist collective Ne1co. The album was recorded from 5–18 March 2011 at Future Music Festival across Australia and at The Enmore Theatre, Sydney and The Palace, Melbourne.

Track listing

 "Intro" - 2:04
 "Song of Life" - 9:09
 "Black Flute" - 8:40
 "Original" - 7:59
 "Afro-Left" - 10:21
 "Storm 3000" - 9:59
 "Release the Pressure" - 9:14
 "Inspection (Check One)" - 10:14
 "Afrika Shox" - 8:01
 "Space Shanty" - 10:24
 "Melt" - 6:47
 "Phat Planet" - 10:07

Personnel

Leftfield
 Neil Barnes - keyboards, programming, vocoder, melodica, berimbau, theremin, guitar
 Adam Wren - engineering, turntables, samples, live mixdown

Additional musicians
 Sebastien Beresford - drums, percussion, programming
 James Atkin (EMF) - percussion on "Afro Left"; bass on "Original"

Vocalists
 Jess Mills on "Original"
 Djum Djum on "Afro Left" 
 Cheshire Cat on "Release the Pressure" and "Inspection: Check One"
 Earl 16 on "Release the Pressure"

References

Leftfield albums
2012 live albums